The 1963 Toledo Rockets football team was an American football team that represented Toledo University in the Mid-American Conference (MAC) during the 1963 NCAA University Division football season. In their first season under head coach Frank Lauterbur, the Rockets compiled a 2–7 record (1–5 against MAC opponents), finished in seventh place in the MAC, and were outscored by all opponents by a combined total of 176 to 118.

The team's statistical leaders included Dan Simrell with 610 passing yards, Jim Gray with 645 rushing yards, and Tom Nolan with 169 receiving yards.

Schedule

References

Toledo
Toledo Rockets football seasons
Toledo Rockets football